Pigs in a blanket is a small hot dog or other sausage wrapped in pastry commonly served as an appetizer in the United States. The similarity in name with that of the UK dish pigs in blankets, which is a sausage wrapped in bacon, sometimes causes confusion.

Ingredients and preparation 
The term "pigs in a blanket" typically refers to hot dogs in croissant dough, but may include Vienna sausages, cocktail or breakfast/link sausages baked inside biscuit dough or croissant dough. American cookbooks from the 1800s have recipes for "little pigs in blankets", but this is a rather different dish of oysters rolled in bacon similar to angels on horseback. The modern version can be traced back to at least 1940, when a US Army cookbook lists "Pork Sausage Links (Pigs) in Blankets".

The dough is sometimes homemade, but canned dough is most common. Pancake dough is also sometimes used, although this combination is more commonly served like a corn dog and sold as a pancake on a stick. The larger variety is served as a quick and easy main course or a light meal (particularly for children) at lunch or supper while the smaller version is served as an appetizer. In Texas, kolaches or klobasneks are a similar dish which originates from Czech immigrants. The meat or savory part, often a sausage but not always, is wrapped in kolache dough and not croissant dough. This dish in Texas is most commonly referred to as "kolache", although traditional Czech-style kolaches are a sweet dish, not a savory dish.

Serving 

Smaller versions of the dish are commonly served as an appetizer or hors d'oeuvre, sometimes with a mustard or aioli dipping sauce, or are accompanied by other foods during the main course.

Similar dishes

A number of countries have similar foods under a variety of names.

In Argentina, the sausage is topped with ketchup and then wrapped in empanada dough and baked.

In Belgium, this is a traditional dish from the city of Namur, where it is called avisance. Historically it was a sausage or sausage meat in bread dough, replaced nowadays with puff pastry.

In Brazil, the sausage is wrapped in bread-like dough, then baked. It's known as enroladinho de salsicha, which means something like "sausage roll", and it's both a fast food and a snack.

In China, a Chinese sausage wrapped in pastry is called là cháng bāo (腊肠包) and is steamed rather than baked.

The name can also refer to a Czech-American dish, klobasnek, a sausage in kolach dough.

In Denmark and in Sweden, a hot dog wrapped in bread is called a fransk hot dog. The name is a reference to the bread's similarity to a baguette. In Denmark, American-style pigs in a blanket are known as pølsehorn, meaning "sausage horns".

In Estonia, they are referred to as viineripirukas, which means "sausage pastry".

In Finland, sausages in pastry are known as nakkipiilo.

The German Würstchen im Schlafrock ("sausage in a dressing gown") uses sausages wrapped in puff pastry or, more rarely, pancakes.  Cheese and bacon are sometimes present.

In Hong Kong, a sausage wrapped in pastry is called cheung jai baau (腸仔包) and is baked.

In Israel, Moshe Ba'Teiva (Moses in the basket) is a children's dish consisting of a kosher hot dog rolled in a sheet of puff pastry and baked.

In Italy, Rollò con würstel is a street food found in Palermo, Sicily made of brioche dough and wurstel.

In Mexico, the sausage is wrapped in a tortilla and deep fried in vegetable oil. The name salchitaco (sausage taco) comes from the fusion of the words salchicha (sausage) and taco.

In the Netherlands, especially in the province of North Brabant a sausage or sausage meat in bread dough is known as a worstenbroodje, which means "sausage bread". In the rest of the country the saucijzenbroodje is more common, with a pastry dough and a shape more like a rectangle.

In New Zealand a "pig in a blanket" is a sausage wrapped in a slice of bread, often with onions and/or sauce added. It is frequently sold as a charity fundraiser.

In Russia, the dish is named Сосиска в тесте (Sosiska v teste, "sausage in dough").

In Serbia, the dish has a name rol viršla. Rol viršla is a very popular type of fast food in Serbia.

See also

 Bagel dog
 Corn dog
 Hot dog
 Egg in the basket
 Galette-saucisse
 Klobasnek
 Pepperoni roll
 Sausage roll
 Toad in the hole
 List of bread dishes
 List of sausage dishes
 List of stuffed dishes

References

External links

Retro Shack: The Hot Dog Goes Haute

Bread dishes
Sausage dishes
Stuffed dishes
American pork dishes